Alex Grey (born November 29, 1953) is an American visual artist, author, teacher, and Vajrayana practitioner known for creating spiritual and psychedelic paintings. He works in multiple forms including performance art, process art, installation art, sculpture, visionary art, and painting.  He is also on the board of advisors for the Center for Cognitive Liberty and Ethics, and is the Chair of Wisdom University's Sacred Art Department. He and his wife Allyson Grey are the co-founders of The Chapel of Sacred Mirrors (CoSM), a non-profit organization in Wappingers Falls, New York.

Early life and education
Grey was born on November 29, 1953, in Columbus, Ohio. His father was a graphic designer and artist. Grey was the middle child. He attended the Columbus College of Art and Design for two years before dropping out.  Grey went on to study art the School of the Museum of Fine Arts at Tufts in Boston in 1975. At the end of art school, Grey met his wife Allyson at a party where they both ingested LSD and later bonded over the experience. He reported that the LSD was initially given to him by his professor.

Career

Grey learned anatomy by working to prepare cadavers for dissection at Harvard Medical School's anatomy department, a position he held for five years. He worked as a medical illustrator for approximately ten years in order to support his studio art practice. Grey also taught anatomy and figure sculpture at New York University for a period of ten years.

Grey is best known for his psychedelic paintings and illustrations. In 1986 Grey's artwork was exhibited at the New Museum in New York City.

Alex and Allyson Grey have worked collaboratively and have openly supported the use of entheogens. Mending the Heart Net, an interactive installation artwork by Alex and Allyson Grey, was displayed at Baltimore's American Visionary Art Museum in 1998–99 as part of the exhibition "Love: Error and Eros".

In 1999, the Museum of Contemporary Art San Diego held a mid-career retrospective of Grey's work titled "Sacred Mirrors: The Visionary Art of Alex Grey". That same year, Grey was noticed by guitarist Adam Jones of the progressive metal band Tool, who later featured his artwork on their albums Lateralus and 10,000 Days.

Illustrations created by Grey have been selected to appear on albums for musical groups such as the Beastie Boys and Nirvana, as well as Meshuggah and The String Cheese Incident. Newsweek magazine, and the Discovery Channel, have featured his artwork. His images have been printed onto sheets of blotter acid and have been used on flyers to promote Rave events.

Grey's artwork has been exhibited worldwide, including at Feature Inc., Tibet House US, Stux Gallery, P.S. 1, the Outsider Art Fair, the Grand Palais in Paris, and the Sao Paulo Biennial in Brazil.

Grey has been a keynote speaker at conferences in Tokyo, Amsterdam, Basel, Barcelona and Manaus.  In the 2012 book Psychedelia, author Patrick Lundborg credits Grey as "the leading psychedelic artist of today, and also one of the foremost proponents of Visionary Art as a style."

Since 2020, Alex Grey and Allyson Grey have created a podcast that features a variety of topics. Episodes include musings about religion, science, visionary art, nature, meditations, and full moon ceremonies.  Mr. and Mrs. Grey have interviewed artists, philosophers, YouTubers, musicians, and PhD candidates.

The Chapel of Sacred Mirrors 
Grey founded the Foundation for Sacred Mirrors (CoSM), a 501(c)3 as a place to permanently display the Chapel of Sacred Mirrors. Additionally, he created the Church of Sacred Mirrors (CoSM).

CoSM allows visitors a place of respite and worship while admiring Grey’s artwork and writings. Other invited artists can display their works at the CoSM. According to CoSM’s website, “The mission of CoSM is to build an enduring sanctuary of visionary art to inspire a global community.”

Located in Wappinger, New York, visitors can stroll the 40 acres while enjoying art by Alex Grey, Allison Grey, and Amy Senn, to name a few. Alex Grey, Allyson Grey, and various other artists created murals that can be found in the cafeteria at CoSM.  The property contains a 10 bedroom Victorian guest home that is decorated with art in the visionary style of Grey. A large amount of Grey’s work is displayed in Entheon, a converted carriage house on the property.  The Greys are currently raising funds for the completion of Entheon. Visitors will enter through bronze doors (see below) that display “Creating a Better World” by Alex Grey.

While in Entheon, visitors can also admire Grey’s works Kissing, Copulating, Pregnancy, Birth, Gaia, Net of Being (featured by the band Tool), and Nursing.” Viewers will also be able to enter the Chapel of Sacred Mirrors.Grey's project The Chapel of Sacred Mirrors (CoSM) first opened to the public in Chelsea, New York in 2004 and drew visionary and psychedelic art fans to the site for four years until its closure in December 2008. The CoSM featured 20 life-size paintings of standing human figures Grey created in the early 1980s.

The Grey's reopened CoSM in Wappingers Falls, New York, a community within Hudson Valley.

Paintings 

Grey's paintings are a blend of sacred, visionary art and postmodern art. He is best known for his paintings of glowing anatomical human bodies, images that "x-ray" the multiple layers of reality. His art is a complex integration of body, mind, and spirit. The Sacred Mirrors, a life-sized series of 21 paintings, took 10 years to complete, and examines in detail the physical and metaphysical anatomy of the individual. "The inner body is meticulously rendered - not just anatomically precise but crystalline in its clarity". Many of his paintings include detailed representations of the skeleton, nervous system, cardiovascular system, and lymphatic system. Grey applies this multidimensional perspective to paint the universal human experience. His figures are shown in positions such as praying, meditating, kissing, copulating, pregnancy, birth, and death.

Grey's work incorporates many religious symbols, including auras, chakras, and icons with geometric shapes and tessellations in natural, industrial, and multicultural situations. Grey's paintings are permeated with an intense and subtle light.

"It is the light that is sublime in Grey’s oeuvre - which is the most important innovation in religious light since the Baroque - and that makes the mundane beings in them seem sublime, in every realistic detail of their exquisite being".

His highly detailed paintings are spiritual and scientific in equal measure, revealing his psychedelic, spiritual and super-natural view of the human species.

In 2002, Holland Cotter, New York Times art critic wrote, "Alex Grey's art, with its New Age symbolism and medical-illustration finesse, might be described as psychedelic realism, a kind of clinical approach to cosmic consciousness. In it, the human figure is rendered transparently with X-ray or CAT-scan eyes, the way Aldous Huxley saw a leaf when he was on mescaline. Every bone, organ and vein is detailed in refulgent color; objects and space are knitted together in dense, decorative linear webs."

Publications
Grey published a large format art book, Sacred Mirrors: The Visionary Art of Alex Grey. The book included essays on the significance of Grey's work by Ken Wilber, and by New York art critic, Carlo McCormick.

Grey's The Mission of Art, a philosophy of art, originally published in 1998 with a foreword by Ken Wilber was reissued in 2017. The book traces the evolution of human consciousness through art history, explores the role of an artist's intention and conscience, and reflects on the creative process as a spiritual path. He promotes the mystical potential of art and argues that the process of artistic creation has an important role to play in the enlightenment of both the artist and the broader culture.

In Transfigurations, published in 2004, Grey addresses his portrayals of light bodies, performance works, his collaborative relationship with Allyson Grey, and their quest to build a Chapel of Sacred Mirrors.

Sounds True has released The Visionary Artist, a CD of Grey's reflections on art as a spiritual practice.

Grey co-edited the book, Zig Zag Zen: Buddhism and Psychedelics (Chronicle Books, 2002, reprinted by Synergetic Press, 2015).

Alex Grey has published a 10 volume journal that features his own artistic works and the works of other visionary thinkers and philosophers.

Films
As an advocate for sacred art, Grey was the subject of the 2004 documentary ARTmind: the healing potential of sacred art.

Grey and the Chapel of Sacred Mirrors gallery in New York City were featured in the 2006 documentary CoSM The Movie, directed by Nick Krasnic.

Grey appeared in the 2006 film Entheogen: Awakening the Divine Within, a documentary about rediscovering an enchanted cosmos in the modern world.

He also appeared in the film DMT: The Spirit Molecule, in which he talked about the importance of the substance DMT in the past and present world, as well as describing some of his personal experiences with the substance and how it influenced his painting.

Grey appeared in the 2016 documentary film Going Furthur.

Personal life 
In 2008, the San Francisco Chronicle reported that Grey lived in New York City with his wife, painter Allyson Grey. They have one daughter, Zena Grey. Grey is a member of the Integral Institute, formed by his friend Ken Wilber.

In the media

Affiliated musicians 

Grey's artwork has often been selected for use by musicians.

 An album of David Byrne remixes called The Visible Man featured Grey's artwork.
 Michael Hedges's album Torched features one of Grey's Holy Fire paintings on the cover.
 The liner notes for the Nirvana album In Utero included a reproduction of Grey's painting Muscle System (Pregnant Woman).
 The String Cheese Incident's album Untying the Not features Grey's work Cosmic Elf, a commission for the cover.
Hip-hop group the Beastie Boys featured Grey's Gaia painting and Vision Crystal image on their album Ill Communication.
 Swedish experimental metal band Meshuggah featured Grey's artwork on their Selfcaged EP.
 Grey contributed stage design for a Tool tour, album art for Lateralus and 10,000 Days, and computer-generated graphics for their "Vicarious" video, as well as the video for "Parabola". Tool displayed Grey's work (including Original Face) on their 2007 tour. Vision Crystal Tondo, The Torch, and The Great Turn were utilized on the 2019 Tool album Fear Inoculum.
In 2004 a live multimedia performance was recorded as a DVD titled Worldspirit featuring the animated artwork and live spoken word of Alex Grey, coupled with the project direction and live music of Kenji Williams.
The alleged mystical properties of Grey's artwork were discussed in Stuart Davis' 2006 DVD Between the Music.
Grey's artwork appears on multiple album covers by DJ/Producer Bassnectar.
In 2008 and 2009, the tribal/psychedelic rock band TELESMA performed Winter Solstice concerts at which Alex and Allyson Grey appeared on stage and painted new original pieces and resulted in Hearing Vision's LIVE a 2010 recording.

In the media

The covers of Sub Rosa, Newsweek, High Times, Shaman's Drum, Shambhala Sun, Juxtapoz, Vision, Gnosis and The Healing Power of Neurofeedback: The Revolutionary LENS Technique for Restoring Optimal Brain Function have featured Grey's artwork.

The Discovery Channel included Grey in a feature on art and creativity in altered states.

The 1994 film Brainscan included a poster of one of the Holy Fire paintings in the main character's bedroom.

The Viking Youth Power Hour interviewed Alex and Allyson Grey about the role of sacred art, the holy shenanigans of Burning Man, and the development of his process.

Grey talks about his personal philosophy in the 2009 film Cognition Factor.

In Variable Star, a 2006 science fiction novel written by Spider Robinson based on a story outline by Robert A. Heinlein, Robinson devotes several pages to his protagonist's discovery of Grey's Sacred Mirrors and Progress of the Soul series, and to using them to enhance meditation.

Books
 1990: Sacred Mirrors: The Visionary Art of Alex Grey, Inner Traditions - Bear & Company, 
 1998: The Mission of Art, Shambhala Publications Inc., 
 2001: Transfigurations, Inner Traditions - Bear & Company, 
 2007: CoSM, Chapel of Sacred Mirrors (Alex Grey & Allyson Grey), CoSM Press, 
 2008: Art Psalms, North Atlantic Books, 
 2012: Net of Being (Alex Grey & Allyson Grey), Inner Traditions - Bear & Company, 
2015: Zig Zag Zen: Buddhism and Psychedelics, (Ed. Allan Badiner, Alex Grey), Synergetic Press,

References

Further reading 
James Oroc, (2018) The New Psychedelic Revolution: The Genesis of the Visionary Age, Inner Traditions/Bear, 

 
 Alex Grey's Body of Light, Raw Vision Issue 26

Living people
Album-cover and concert-poster artists
Artists from New York City
Columbus College of Art and Design alumni
American contemporary artists
Former atheists and agnostics
Transcendentalism
Artists from Columbus, Ohio
Psychedelic artists
American psychedelic drug advocates
American Buddhists
Tibetan Buddhists from the United States
Visionary artists
Whetstone High School (Columbus, Ohio) alumni
American performance artists
1953 births